Douglas Wood is an American children's author, author, singer, songwriter, speaker, and musician. One of Wood's children's books, Old Turtle and the Broken Truth, won the International Reading Association Book of the Year Award.

Education
Wood received his Bachelors of Music Education Degree from Morningside College in Sioux City, Iowa. Thereafter he completed graduate course studies for a master's degree in psychology from St. Cloud State University, St. Cloud, MN.

Biography
Douglas Wood is an American writer of many books for children and adults, with over two and one half million copies in print. Old Turtle and Grandad's Prayers of the Earth are among his best known works. Among Wood's honors and awards are the Christopher Medal, American Booksellers Book of the Year, International Reading Association Book of the Year, and Parent's Choice Award. His book, Miss Little's Gift, was recognized as a Notable Book by the Smithsonian Institution. Much of Douglas Wood's thematic material comes from a lifelong interest in the outdoors, particularly the relationship between the human spirit and the natural world. In 2011 Douglas Wood narrated the symphonic setting of Old Turtle at the Lincoln Center.

In addition to his work as an author, Douglas Wood is also a musician, who composes and performs music for 12 string guitar, banjo, mandolin, and keyboards. He often performs with his band, WildSpirit. As with his books, much of his music is inspired by the world of nature.

Public speaking
Wood speaks frequently at literary, environmental, and wellness conferences and conventions on the topics wilderness, personal growth, spiritual health, and the outdoors.

He has appeared at the National Wellness Conference, American Booksellers Convention, International Reading Association, Minnesota Naturalist's Association, Association of Interpretive Naturalists, World Wilderness Congress and Midwest Environmental Conference and others.

Selected books

Discography

Major awards and achievements
1992: Minnesota Book Award
1993: ABBY Award – American Booksellers Book of the Year
1993: International Reading Association Book of the Year
1994: Who's Who in America, 48th Edition
1999: The Christopher Medal
2000: Parents Choice Award
2009: Alumni Educator of the Year – Morningside College
2009: Smithsonian Notable Book
2011: Oppenheim Toy Portfolio Best Book Award
2013: Lifetime Achievement Award, MN Association for Environmental Ed

External links 
  douglaswood.com official website
 Children's Literature Network biography and complete booklist
Douglas Wood talks about Old Turtle and EarthSongs with Julaine Heit, Northern Lights Minnesota Author Interview TV Series #230 (1992):  [https://reflections.mndigital.org/catalog/p16022coll38:38#/kaltura_video]

Video
 ''Happy Birthday We're Sending Love Your Way" written and performed by Douglas Wood, December 18, 2012
 Stories of Nature” written and presented by Douglas Wood, October 1999
 In Our Hands” written and performed by Douglas Wood, March 2013

References

American male singers
Living people
American children's writers
1951 births